Juan Manuel Delgado may refer to:

 Juanma (footballer born 1977) (Juan Manuel Delgado Moreno), Spanish retired footballer 
 Juan Manuel Delgado Lloria (born 1990), commonly known as Juanma, Spanish footballer
 Juan Manuel Delgado y Hernández de Tejada (1896–1974), commonly known as Juan Delgado, Spanish fencer

See also
Juan Delgado (disambiguation)